Herring Island can refer to:

Herring Island
Herring Island (Victoria) in South Yarra, Victoria
Herring Island (Queen Anne's County, Maryland) in Queen Anne's County, Maryland
Herring Island (Elk River), in the Elk River, Maryland
Herring Island (Talbot County, Maryland) in Talbot County, Maryland